The Queen Of African Music is a 17-track compilation album by Miriam Makeba, released by Theo König, Verlag Pläne in 1987.

Track listing
 "African Convention"
 "I Shall Sing"
 "Goodbye Poverty"
 "Mas Que Nada"
 "Murtala"
 "Chicken (Kikirikiki)"
 "The Lion Cries"
 "Samba"
 "Quit It"
 "We Got to Make It"
 "Jolinkomo"
 "Ndibanga Hamba"
 "Iyaguduza"
 "Click Song"
 "Malaisha"
 "Mana Ndiyalila"
 "Pata Pata"

1987 greatest hits albums
Miriam Makeba albums